The Good Life is a 1974 live album by Oscar Peterson, accompanied by Joe Pass and Niels-Henning Ørsted Pedersen.

Track listing
 "Wheatland" (Oscar Peterson) – 12:17
 "Wave" (Antonio Carlos Jobim) – 10:46
 "For Count" (Peterson) – 6:49
 "The Good Life" (Sacha Distel, Jack Reardon) – 7:12
 "On a Clear Day (You Can See Forever)" (Burton Lane, Alan Jay Lerner) – 7:44

Personnel
 Oscar Peterson – piano
 Joe Pass – guitar
 Niels-Henning Ørsted Pedersen – double bass

References

1974 live albums
Oscar Peterson live albums
Pablo Records live albums
Albums produced by Norman Granz